Albert Robert Allen (11 October 1916 – 7 February 1992) was an English footballer who played as a winger in the Football League for Clapton Orient, Fulham, Doncaster Rovers, Northampton Town and Colchester United. The majority of his success as a player came at Colchester United, where he won the Southern League Cup and finished as runner-up in the league the same year, helping the club gain entry to the Football League.

Career
Born in Bromley-by-Bow, London, two-time England Schoolboy international Allen was on the books at Tottenham Hotspur before leaving to join Leytonstone in 1932, and then rekindled his Football League career at Clapton Orient in 1933 where he made one appearance. Allen then joined another London-based club, Fulham, where he made eleven appearances in two years.

Allen moved north to play for Doncaster Rovers in 1937, joining for a fee of £350. He scored six goals in 31 games for the club during his single season before moving back to London with Brentford, where he failed to make a first-team appearance. He then played for Dartford prior to World War II. During the war years, Allen made guest appearances for Port Vale and then Northampton Town before joining the latter when League football recommenced following the hostilities.

In 1947, Allen joined Southern League club Colchester United, where he helped the club finish the Southern League Cup as runners-up twice before winning the competition in 1950. He also aided the club in their quest for League football with election to the Football League in the same year after ending the 1949–50 season as league runners-up. After making his debut on 30 August 1947 in a 5–1 win at Bedford Town, Allen went on to make 70 appearances for Colchester in the Southern League and Football League, before a serious knee injury suffered in a 2–0 defeat to Watford at Vicarage Road on 10 February 1951 ended his professional career. He later made a brief return to the Southern League with Bedford Town in August 1951 and retired at the end of the 1951–52 season after having made 45 appearances.

Personal life
As a youth, alongside appearing for England Schoolboys, Allen played tennis at Wimbledon and was a renowned London Schools sprinter, but opted to pursue a career in football.

After his move to Bedford Town in 1951, Allen found himself in hospital a year later with the prospect of a further year of treatment ahead of him. Colchester arranged a benefit match with Bedford in September 1952 to help aid his family's immediate financial concerns, with a gate of 4,500 in attendance. He later recovered and became a welfare officer in the Redbridge education department.

Albert Robert Allen died in Epping on 7 February 1992 at the age of 75.

Statistics
Source:

Honours
Colchester United
1947–48 Southern League Cup runner-up
1948–49 Southern League Cup runner-up
1949–50 Southern League Cup winner
1949–50 Southern League runner-up

All honours referenced by:

References

1916 births
1992 deaths
Footballers from Bromley-by-Bow
English footballers
Association football wingers
Tottenham Hotspur F.C. players
Leytonstone F.C. players
Leyton Orient F.C. players
Fulham F.C. players
Doncaster Rovers F.C. players
Brentford F.C. players
Dartford F.C. players
Port Vale F.C. wartime guest players
Northampton Town F.C. wartime guest players
Northampton Town F.C. players
Colchester United F.C. players
Bedford Town F.C. players
English Football League players
Southern Football League players